The 2010 Michigan Secretary of State election was held on Tuesday, November 2, 2010 to elect the Michigan Secretary of State for a four-year term. Incumbent Republican Terri Lynn Land was term-limited and unable to run for re-election.

Candidates

Republican Party
Former state representative Ruth Johnson won the party's nomination during the state convention.

Democratic Party
Law professor Jocelyn Benson won the party's nomination during the state convention.

Results

References

External links

2010 Michigan elections
Michigan Secretary of State elections
Michigan
November 2010 events in the United States